Živkovci is a village situated in Ljig municipality in Serbia.

References

Populated places in Kolubara District